The Romanian Records in Swimming are the fastest times ever swum by an individual from Romania. These records are recognized and kept by Romania's national swimming federation: Federația Română de Natație şi Pentatlon Modern (FRNPM). (Note the federation also oversees Modern pentathlon.)

FRNPM keeps records for both for events in long course (50m) and short course (25m) pools, for males and females. Records are kept in the following events (by stroke):
freestyle (liber): 50, 100, 200, 400, 800 and 1500;
backstroke (spate): 50, 100 and 200;
breaststroke (bras): 50, 100 and 200;
butterfly (fluture): 50, 100 and 200;
individual medley (mixt): 100 (25m only), 200 and 400;
relays: 4 × 50 free, 4 × 100 free, 4 × 200 free, 4 × 50 medley, and 4 × 100 medley (club and national for all 5 relays).

Long course (50m)

Men

|-bgcolor=#DDDDDD
|colspan=9|
|-

|-bgcolor=#DDDDDD
|colspan=9|
|-

|-bgcolor=#DDDDDD
|colspan=9|
|-

|-bgcolor=#DDDDDD
|colspan=9|
|-

|-bgcolor=#DDDDDD
|colspan=9|
|-

|-bgcolor=#DDDDDD
|colspan=9|
|-

Women

|-bgcolor=#DDDDDD
|colspan=9|
|-

|-bgcolor=#DDDDDD
|colspan=9|
|-

|-bgcolor=#DDDDDD
|colspan=9|
|-

|-bgcolor=#DDDDDD
|colspan=9|
|-

|-bgcolor=#DDDDDD
|colspan=9|
|-

|-bgcolor=#DDDDDD
|colspan=9|
|-

Mixed relay

Short course (25m)

Men

|-bgcolor=#DDDDDD
|colspan=9|
|-

|-bgcolor=#DDDDDD
|colspan=9|
|-

|-bgcolor=#DDDDDD
|colspan=9|
|-

|-bgcolor=#DDDDDD
|colspan=9|
|-

|-bgcolor=#DDDDDD
|colspan=9|
|-

|-bgcolor=#DDDDDD
|colspan=9|
|-

Women

|-bgcolor=#DDDDDD
|colspan=9|
|-

|-bgcolor=#DDDDDD
|colspan=9|
|-

|-bgcolor=#DDDDDD
|colspan=9|
|-

|-bgcolor=#DDDDDD
|colspan=9|
|-

|-bgcolor=#DDDDDD
|colspan=9|
|-

|-bgcolor=#DDDDDD
|colspan=9|
|-

References
General
 Romanian Long Course Records 26 March 2022 updated
 Romanian Short Course Records 13 November 2022 updated
Specific

External links
  Federatiei Romane de Natatie si Pentatlon Modern

Romania
Records
Swimming
Swimming